The Holly Bush is a Grade II listed public house in Holly Mount, Hampstead, London, NW3.

The building was originally built as a house in the 1790s and used as Assembly Rooms in the 19th century before becoming a pub in 1928.

In 2010, it was bought by Fuller's Brewery.

Liam Gallagher has been known to frequent the pub.

References

Grade II listed buildings in the London Borough of Camden
Grade II listed pubs in London
Buildings and structures in Hampstead
Pubs in the London Borough of Camden
Fuller's pubs